John Derek Smith FRS (1924–2003) was a British molecular biologist who participated in many of the major discoveries at the Laboratory of Molecular Biology (LMB) in Cambridge.

 Born Southampton, England 8 December 1924
 Scientific staff, Agricultural Research Council Virus Research Unit, Cambridge 1945-59;
 Research Fellow, Clare College, Cambridge 1949-52;
 Rockefeller Foundation Fellow, University of California, Berkeley 1955-57;
 Senior Research Fellow, California Institute of Technology 1959-62,
 Member of Scientific Staff, LMB, Cambridge 1962-88
 Sherman Fairchild Scholar 1974-75;
 Head, Subdivision of Biochemistry, Cell Biology Division 1976-88
 FRS 1976;

In 1955 he married Ruth Aney (marriage dissolved 1968); died Cambridge 22 November 2003. 
He had a long term relationship with Rosemary Myers, an artist, which continued until his death.
He was one of the very few scientists who understood the importance of nucleic acids before 1953.  According to Nobel Laureate Sidney Altman
"John Smith was a venerable nucleic acids biochemist. He had worked on the nucleic acids of viruses long before coming to the MRC-LMB and was an expert on identification and characterization of nucleotides, much of it done on unlabeled material, detected by observing chromatographs under UV light. He was a quiet person but very lively in conversations about science."

His doctoral students include Gerard R. Wyatt.

References

1924 births
2003 deaths
British molecular biologists
Fellows of the Royal Society
Scientists from Southampton
20th-century British biologists